The Sentry is an oil on canvas painting by Dutch artist Carel Fabritius, created in 1654. It is an oil painting on canvas of 68 by 58 cm (27 by 23 in). The work is in the collection of the Staatliches Museum in Schwerin and was restored in 2004. It represents a resting sentry and a dog.

References

External links 

1654 paintings
Paintings by Carel Fabritius
Dogs in art